Timothy C. Forbes is a member of the Forbes publishing family and the son of Malcolm Forbes.  The family owns the Forbes magazine chain.  Forbes attended St. Mark's School of Southborough, Massachusetts. He graduated from Brown University in 1976.

Forbes is chief operating officer of Forbes, a position he assumed in April 1996. Forbes joined the company in 1986 after negotiating the acquisition of the American Heritage division.

References

St. Mark's School (Massachusetts) alumni
Brown University alumni
Living people
Tim
Year of birth missing (living people)